Amar Dongol is a Nepali striker who currently plays for Ranipokhari Corner Team and the Nepal national team.

International Football
His debut was against Pakistan in a friendly. His first major tournament was 2014 AFC Challenge Cup qualification in game against Northern Mariana Islands, in which he entered the match in the 72nd minute. He wears 33 number jersey for the national team.

International goals

References

Living people
Nepalese footballers
Nepal international footballers
Ranipokhari Corner Team players
Association football forwards
Footballers at the 2014 Asian Games
Year of birth missing (living people)
Asian Games competitors for Nepal